Bonpland is the remains of a lunar impact crater that is attached to the walled plain Fra Mauro to the north and Parry to the east. The intersection of their rims forms a three-pointed mountainous rise. To the southeast is the small crater Tolansky. Bonpland lies on the eastern edge of Mare Cognitum. It is named after Aimé Bonpland, a French explorer and botanist.

This rim of Bonpland is heavily worn and eroded, with the intrusion of Parry in the east creating a bulging extension to the southeast. The floor has been flooded by lava in the past, leaving a relatively flat surface that is broken by a series of narrow clefts. These are collectively designated the Rimae Parry. The clefts cross the rim to the south and also to the north, extending into the neighboring Fra Mauro.

Satellite craters
By convention these features are identified on lunar maps by placing the letter on the side of the crater midpoint that is closest to Bonpland.

The following craters have been renamed by the IAU.
 Bonpland E — See Kuiper (lunar crater).

References

External links

Bonpland at The Moon Wiki
 LTO-76C1 Bonpland — L&PI topographic map

Impact craters on the Moon